The Canton, Illinois Tornadoes of 1975 was a destructive summer tornado event which occurred as part of a significant severe thunderstorm outbreak concentrated from eastern Iowa across northern and central Illinois on the afternoon and evening of July 23, 1975.

Outbreak

Widespread significantly severe damaging wind occurred in many areas across eastern Iowa and the northwestern third of Illinois. Many corn fields were flattened and trees were downed, and light structural damage occurred. Power was cut to thousands across the western and northwestern suburbs of Chicago. Lightning also damaged several houses and buildings. One woman was killed when venturing outside to close her car windows and a six-story International Harvester warehouse was ignited into a large fire.

Canton tornadoes
The supercell thunderstorm first showed evidence in the damage survey near Bushnell. On several farms broad convergent and cyclonic crop damage exhibited evidence of the parent tornadocyclone. Trees were uprooted and structural damage varied with windows broken and buildings partially unroofed.

First tornado
Total damages were around $250,000.

Canton tornado

Before that tornado lifted, a second tornado touched down to the left of the first tornado at 4:45 p.m. on the east side of Fiatt, and it too in conjunction with intense downburst winds proceeded in a meandering path roughly eastward roughly along Route 9. There was no break in the damage because of the proximity of the tornadoes and the accompanying exceptionally intense downburst activity.

It devastated much of the downtown area, destroying or damaging 127 businesses concentrated within a five block swath. Many of these buildings were completely destroyed and others were so severely damaged to require razing. The tornado caused heavy residential losses with about 100 frame houses destroyed and an additional 300 damaged; 50 trailers were destroyed and another 100 were damaged. Two people were killed at Horton's Mobile Home Manor on the eastern side of town. Sixty-nine people were injured, of which 14 required hospitalization and 45 were treated and released. Straight-line winds from downbursts inflicted less intense damage across the remainder of town. Total damages amounted to around $25 million (1975 USD). Power was not restored to some areas for a week. The National Guard was deployed, and the damage was so immense and overwhelming that the city was declared a federal disaster area. All stores except for those selling food were forced to close, most perishable food required trashing, and the town was immediately closed to non-residents not on official business.

Farms also suffered substantial damage to crops and buildings with agricultural losses over $3 million. Total tornado area was 37.5 sq. miles (60 km2) with a very high destruction potential index (DPI) -- integrating intensity, path length, and width—value of 150.

Science benefits 
Downbursts, a recent concept by Fujita at the time (the 1974 Super Outbreak the year before was also significant in their conceptual development), covered a very large area; these as well as a continuous series of smaller but very intense microbursts were responsible for the meandering course of the tornadoes (although the average of the path was linear) and for some changes in intensity. It is thought that a microburst may be responsible for breaking up the first tornado. A continuous damage swath connected the events regardless. Conversely, another microburst seems to have caused the tornado to intensify on the eastern side of Canton and coincided with the two deaths.

1835 Canton tornado 
Canton and surrounding areas were devastated by an earlier tornado on June 18, 1835. Touching down around 10 p.m., it decimated rural farms, killing four; before it traversed through Canton, killing four in town, including the town's founder and his young son. Injuries totaled forty.

See also 
 List of North American tornadoes and tornado outbreaks
 Rear flank downdraft and forward flank downdraft

References 

 "Tornado Kills Three in Illinois". The Washington Post; Jul 24, 1975; A7.

F3 tornadoes
Tornadoes of 1975
Fulton County, Illinois
Tornadoes in Illinois
Canton, Illinois Tornado, 1975
1975 natural disasters in the United States
Canton, Illinois
July 1975 events in the United States